Brett Yorgey (born 13 October 1960) is a former Australian rules footballer who played with Collingwood in the Victorian Football League (VFL).

Yorgey played his early football at Perth in the Western Australian Football League (WAFL). His first stint in the VFL, at South Melbourne, didn't result in a senior game but joined Collingwood in 1987 and made his senior debut, against Geelong at Waverley Park mid-season. On debut, Yorgey had 19 disposals, and kicked two goals and two behinds. He appeared in all of Collingwood's remaining games for the year, except their last.

In 1989, Yorgey was appointed captain-coach of Port Melbourne. They finished the season in eighth position and after falling to 10th the following year, the former Collingwood player was replaced by Doug Searl.

References

1960 births
Living people
Collingwood Football Club players
Perth Football Club players
Port Melbourne Football Club players
Port Melbourne Football Club coaches
Australian rules footballers from Western Australia
New South Wales Australian rules football State of Origin players